Mati, officially the City of Mati, is a 5th class component city and capital of the province of Davao Oriental, Philippines. According to the 2020 census, it has a population of 147,547 people.

It is located on the south-eastern side of Mindanao.

History

Mati comes from the Mandayan word Maa-ti, which refers to the town's creek that easily dries up even after heavy rain. Pioneer settlers were tribes Kalagan, Mandayan and both Maguindanao & Maranao whom carried strong Arabic and Indo-Malayan influences.

Spanish period 
Captain Prudencio Garcia, the pioneer political-military head in 1861, and his comrade Juan Nazareno founded the settlement of Mati and two other communities in Davao Oriental.

American period 
By October 29, 1903, Mati was declared a municipality by virtue of Act No. 21. By 1907, Act No. 189 further reaffirmed the establishment of its local government. Francisco Rojas was the first appointed mayor while the first elected mayor was Patricio Cunanan in 1923. Mati became the capital of Davao Oriental in 1967.

Japanese occupation and World War II 
The Japanese Imperial forces landed in town and occupied most of eastern Davao region in 1942. Mati was liberated in 1945 by the Allied Philippine Commonwealth troops of the 6th, 10th, 101st, 102nd, 103rd, 104th, 106th, 107th and 110th Infantry Division of the Philippine Commonwealth Army, 10th Infantry Regiment of the Philippine Constabulary and the Davaoeño guerrilla units.

Contemporary Period
Mati celebrated its grand centennial of its founding as a town in 2003.

Cityhood

On June 20, 2007, the Commission on Elections officially proclaimed the ratification of Republic Act 9408 converting the Municipality of Mati into a component city.

There were 18,267 actual voters out of the 51,287 registered voters in 26 villages and 266 polling precincts during the June 18 plebiscite. Final tabulation showed Yes – 18,267 votes (%); No – 846 (1.6%).

The Supreme Court declared the cityhood law of Mati and 15 other cities unconstitutional after a petition filed by the League of Cities of the Philippines in its ruling on November 18, 2008. On December 22, 2009, the cityhood law of Mati and 15 other municipalities regain its status as cities again after the court reversed its ruling on November 18, 2008. On August 23, 2010, the court reinstated its ruling on November 18, 2008, causing Mati and 15 cities to become regular municipalities. Finally, on February 15, 2011, Mati becomes a city again including the 15 municipalities declaring that the conversion to cityhood met all legal requirements.

After six years of legal battle, in its board resolution, the League of Cities of the Philippines acknowledged and recognized the cityhood of Mati and 15 other cities.

Geography

Mati is home to three protected areas, the Mount Hamiguitan Range Wildlife Sanctuary, Mati Protected Landscape, and Pujada Bay Protected Landscape and Seascape. The Dahican Beach is also frequented by tourists and locals.

Barangays
Mati is politically subdivided into 26 barangays. In 1957, the barrio then known as Cabuaya was renamed to Dawan.

Climate

Demographics
Mati is the fifth largest city/municipality in Davao Region, after Davao City, Tagum, Panabo, and Digos.

Ethnicity and Languages 
Cebuano is the most widely spoken language and the corresponding ethnicity (which includes the Boholano subgroup) accounts for 71.55% of the total household population according to a 2000 census. Mandaya ranks second with 12.74%, followed by Kalagan with 6.87%. Most residents of Mati are descendants of migrants from the Visayas who came for employment opportunities in logging, mining, farming, fishing, trading and teaching.

Religion 
Roman Catholicism is the major religious group, comprising the 80% of the total population. Islam comes in second with 8 percent, Iglesia Ni Cristo comes in third comprising with 6 percent. A small number of believers of other Christian groups like the United Church of Christ and Seventh Day Adventist are in the city as well.

The Cathedral of San Nicolas de Tolentino is the center of Diocese of Mati under the jurisdiction of Roman Catholic Archdiocese of Davao. Two parishes are in Mati: one in the town center and one in Barangay Dawan.

Economy

This region is linked to the markets of Mindanao, Malaysia and Indonesia. Most of the local people rely on agriculture and agro-industries for a living. Exports include bananas, pineapples, coconuts and fish. Because of its tropical nature and beaches, tourism is a rapidly growing business. Mining is also a contributor to the city's economy, due to the large deposits of copper in the city outskirts.

Culture

Mati celebrates two annual grand festivals: the Pujada Bay Festival every June, and the Sambuokan Festival every October. Compared to the Kadayawan of Davao and other festivals, both of Mati's are relatively new. The Pujada Bay Festival started in 2004 to promote and protect the Pujada Bay, while the Sambuokan Festival started in 2001 to unite Matinians during the commemoration of the municipality's founding anniversary every October 29. In years, both festivals have become alternative tourist destinations as competitors from various regions in the country start pouring in for competitions like streetdancing, boat racing, skimboarding, and frisbee.

Education
Mati City is the educational center of the province of Davao Oriental. The state university of the province, the Davao Oriental State University, is in Dahican, as is the Davao Oriental Regional Science High School. There are two other colleges in the city: Mati Polytechnic College and Mati Doctors College.

In basic education, seven private schools, sixteen public high schools, and a number of public elementary schools are located in the city. The City Schools Division of Mati supervises these schools.

Insfrastructure

Transportation
The pedicab or tricycle is the major means of transportation around the city. In recent years, underbone motorcycles have earned quite a popularity among professionals and students, thus easily becoming a public transport alternative to commuters who prefer more speed. Jeepneys are available for travels from Mati to its neighboring towns while vans and buses are still the only means of transportation from Mati to other cities.

Mati Airport is meant to serve the city, but only accommodates chartered flights.

There is also a seaport in Mati. The Mati Seaport in Pujada Bay is one of only three seaports in the whole province of Davao Oriental.

Power
Mati is served by the Davao Oriental Electric Cooperative for its power needs.

Water service
The Mati City Water District is the local water provider for the city.

Sister cities
 Tagum, Davao del Norte

See also
Subangan Museum

References

External links

 
 Mati Profile at the DTI Cities and Municipalities Competitive Index
 [ Philippine Standard Geographic Code]
Philippine Census Information
Mati City Travel Guide
Local Governance Performance Management System

Cities in the Davao Region
Populated places in Davao Oriental
Provincial capitals of the Philippines
Populated places established in 1903
1903 establishments in the Philippines
Beaches of the Philippines
Component cities in the Philippines